Homogyna sanguicosta is a moth of the family Sesiidae. It is known from Cameroon, Zambia and Zimbabwe.

References

Sesiidae
Lepidoptera of Cameroon
Lepidoptera of Zambia
Lepidoptera of Zimbabwe
Moths of Sub-Saharan Africa
Moths described in 1919